Frank is a studio album by new wave group Squeeze, released in 1989. The album sold poorly, and Squeeze was dropped by A&M Records while on tour. Forced to take offers from different major labels for the first time in their career, the band soon signed with Reprise Records and began working on their next studio album, Play.

Frank peaked at number 58 in the UK Albums Chart. It peaked at No. 113 on the Billboard 200.

Production
Frank was recorded live in the studio with producer Eric "E.T." Thorngren.

Critical reception
Trouser Press called the album the band's best since Argybargy, writing: "Relocating its original magic with memorably inventive material and spirited delivery, Squeeze here seems exuberantly youthful, as if music-making had suddenly become fun again." Phoenix New Times wrote that Squeeze went "for a live garagey sound that finally gives [Gilson] Lavis' powerhouse drumming center-stage placement." The Rolling Stone Album Guide called the album "well-crafted" but "only occasionally involving."

Track listing
All songs written by Chris Difford and Glenn Tilbrook except as indicated.
 "Frank" (Public domain, no author) – 0:15
 "If It's Love" – 4:02
 "Peyton Place" – 4:08
 "Rose I Said" – 3:36
 "Slaughtered, Gutted and Heartbroken" – 4:37
 "(This Could Be) The Last Time" – 3:49
 "She Doesn't Have to Shave" – 3:27
 "Love Circles" – 5:34
 "Melody Motel" – 3:51
 "Can of Worms" – 4:47
 "Dr. Jazz" (Jools Holland) – 4:04
 "Is It Too Late" – 3:12

Bonus tracks on 2007 CD reissue
"Red Light" (b-side of "Love Circles") – 4:23
"Frank's Bag" (b-side of "If It's Love") – 3:43
"Good Times Bring Me Down" (previously unreleased) – 5:14
"Any Other Day" (previously unreleased) – 3:42
"Who's That" (demo, b-side of "Love Circles") – 2:41
"If I'm Dead" (Glenn Tilbrook demo) – 2:14
"She Doesn't Have to Shave" (live, BBC Radio 1 Acoustic Session 19/10/1989) – 3:11
"Melody Motel" (live, BBC Radio 1 Acoustic Session 19/10/1989) – 3:52

Personnel
Squeeze
 Chris Difford – guitars, backing vocals, lead vocals (5, 8)
 Glenn Tilbrook – keyboards, guitars, lead and backing vocals
 Jools Holland – acoustic piano, organ, backing vocals, lead vocals (11)
 Keith Wilkinson – basses, backing vocals
 Gilson Lavis – drums

Additional personnel
 Matt Irving – accordion (3, 9)
 Karen Beany, Monique Dyan and Barrie St. Johns – backing vocals (2)

Production
 Squeeze – arrangements 
 Glenn Tilbrook – producer 
 Eric "ET" Thorngren – producer, engineer, mixing 
 Paul Tipler – assistant engineer 
 Mark Willie – assistant engineer 
 Stylorouge – design 
 Chris Difford, Gilson Lavis, Glenn Tilbrook and Keith Wilkinson – portrait photography 
 Trevor Rogers – front cover and inner sleeve photography

References

Squeeze (band) albums
1989 albums
A&M Records albums
Albums produced by Glenn Tilbrook